Francisco Ernesto Perozo is a Dominican film actor, assistant director and producer. and also he had a relationship with Denise Quiñones Miss Universe 2001 from 2010-2011.

Filmography

References 

Living people
Date of birth missing (living people)
Dominican Republic male film actors
Dominican Republic people of Spanish descent
People from Santiago de los Caballeros
Year of birth missing (living people)